Taherabad-e Barbaryeha (also Romanized as Ţāherābād-e Barbaryehā; also known as Ţāherābād-e ‘Olyā) is a village in Pasakuh Rural District, Zavin District, Kalat County, Razavi Khorasan Province, Iran. At the 2006 census, its population was 42, in 11 families.

References 

Populated places in Kalat County